Cross Platform Interface Description Language (XPIDL) is the interface definition language developed by Mozilla.org to specify XPCOM interfaces.

It is similar to the Object Management Group's CORBA IDL.

Mozilla provides a utility xpidl that converts the IDL files into XPCOM Type Library (.xpt) files.

References

External links 
 , developer.mozilla.org
 Adding XPIDL interface files to the build process, mozilla.org
 Creating XPCOM components with JavaScript, Phillip Perkins

Mozilla